Kolodiivka is a Ukrainian village located in Ternopil Raion of Ternopil Oblast. It is near the city of Ternopil, and located in the Skalat region. Kolodiivka belongs to Skalat urban hromada, one of the hromadas of Ukraine. 

It includes numerous farms all around the village and two churches. The village has a long history.

Until 18 July 2020, Kolodiivka belonged to Pidvolochysk Raion. The raion was abolished in July 2020 as part of the administrative reform of Ukraine, which reduced the number of raions of Ternopil Oblast to three. The area of Pidvolochysk Raion was merged into Ternopil Raion.

References

Villages in Ternopil Raion
Podolia Voivodeship
Kingdom of Galicia and Lodomeria
Tarnopol Voivodeship